The State Farm Holiday Classic, named after the title sponsor State Farm Insurance, is one of the largest co-ed, high school holiday basketball tournaments in the United States, with 64 teams (32 boys and 32 girls). Held annually for four days following Christmas and dubbed "The Best Basketball This Side of March", the Classic is held at numerous college and high-school venues throughout Bloomington-Normal, Illinois. In 2017 the tournament will be played December 27–30.

History

For nearly four decades, the Holiday Classic has been a showcase of talent and basketball in Bloomington-Normal. The 2017 tournament will be the 39th anniversary for one of the nation's largest coed high school holiday basketball tournaments.

The Classic was originated in 1975 and was first called the Illinois State Classic. Normal Community High School was crowned the first boys champion by defeating Chicago Brother Rice, 60–51. Over the next 10 years (through 1985), Lincoln would play in the championship game four times (winning twice) and Galesburg would win four championships, including three straight titles from 1981 to 1983. In the beginning, the Classic field consisted of a combination of 16 Class A (small school) and Class AA (large school) teams, from all over the state including all four intercity schools. The Classic took a break from 1986 through 1989, but came back in 1990 and was known as the University High Classic. Sherrard was crowned the champ in 1990, and two years later Gridley became the first Class A school to slay the giants and walk away as champion of the Holiday Classic.

In 1995, the Classic turned down the road that would eventually lead it to the event as it is known today. A community volunteer group, spearheaded by current tournament president Dan Highland, took over all duties and responsibilities for the tournament. This group, then known as the Classic Organizing Group, Inc. (COG), consisted of leaders from all aspects of the Bloomington-Normal community. The tournament was then called the Bloomington-Normal Holiday Classic, and later took on Converse as its title sponsor in 1996 and 1997.  Major changes implemented at the time included having 32 participating boys' teams, and breaking the field into two 16-team sections (Class A and Class AA to mirror the IHSA state tournament). All teams would be guaranteed three games, and those teams which won all three games would come back on the fourth and final day to determine a champion in each class in the morning. The night session would consist of the two losing teams playing against each other for third place, while the two champs went head to head for the title of Grand Champion. Rockford Boylan won the first Grand Championship game in 1995, defeating Bloomington Central Catholic 74–63. The next year saw Manito Midwest Central, led by Ryan Knuppel, become the second Class A team to win the Classic by defeating Boylan, 64–58, in one of the most exciting games in tournament history.

The Classic also took on a different twist in 1995 by hosting an 8-team girls' shootout. This shootout evolved into a 14-team tournament in 1997, and is now a full-fledged 32-team tournament, mirroring the boys tournament format. Galesburg was the first girls Grand Champion in 1997, by overcoming a 17-point deficit and winning a 77-74 thriller over Class A Mendota on a last-second three-pointer by Jaque Howard. Galesburg won the first three Grand Championships (1997, 98 & 99) and had a winning streak of 16 games, before being defeated by Urbana in 2000. That same year, Rock Island Alleman became the only Class A team, and the only team other than Galesburg, to win the girls Grand Championship.

In 1999, the Classic got a big shot in the arm with the announcement of State Farm Insurance as its title sponsor. The State Farm Holiday Classic, as it is known today, was able to implement a variety of enhancements thanks to this support, and still continues to find new ways to be the best tournament in the nation. By now the event was starting to gain national recognition, and that included adding teams from across the country to its tournament field. After testing the waters with a team from Milwaukee, Wisconsin in 1996, the Classic has seen teams participate from Washington, D.C.; Kentucky; Tennessee; Ohio; Indiana; Florida; Mesa, AZ; Missouri, Pittsburgh, PA; and New Orleans, LA.

In 2001, the COG, now known as the Classic Tournament, Inc., experimented with eliminating the cross-over Grand Championship game and crowning two girls' champions, one in each class. The experiment worked so well that the same idea was implemented into the boys' tournament in 2002. By this time, the Grand Championship game had become somewhat anticlimactic for the fans and teams alike, as many times the Class AA teams were too overpowering for the smaller schools. With the new system in place, all teams are now guaranteed four games and championship night has been revived to the point where near capacity Shirk Center crowds are able to witness four consecutive championship games.

Over the years the Classic has seen its share of great individual performances. In 1985, Rockton Hononegah's Jim Shikenjanski averaged nearly 33 points a game, and pulled down 66 rebounds over the course of the tournament. Eight years later in 1993, Mike Robinson of Peoria Richwoods knocked down 18 field goals in one game, while in 1999 Rock Island Alleman's Tyler Ryan killed 9 three-pointers for a tournament record. In 1996, Joey Range from Galesburg wowed the crowd with a tournament record 55 points in one game, while Normal U-High's Jeremy Stanton delivered an unselfish 18 assists in one game. And of course who could forget watching the man-child, Eddy Curry, go from signing autographs in the Shirk Center bleachers to a first round draft pick of the Chicago Bulls right out of South Holland Thornwood. Yet maybe the crowning individual achievement was when Olney East Richland's Brittany Johnson became Illinois' all-time career (girls or boys) prep hoops scoring leader in the second round of the 2006 tournament, breaking the record on a three-point play in the third quarter.

With the Classic becoming more successful, it looked for ways to give back the community and increase its philanthropic efforts. In 2002, local Special Olympics Illinois basketball teams were given the chance to participate in a one-day shootout at the Shirk Center on Championship Day of the tournament. These teams then had the chance to participate in an 8-minute exhibition during halftime of the championship games that night on the Shirk Center floor. This effort proved to be very popular among the full-house crowd in attendance, as well as the players who experienced this once-in-a-lifetime opportunity. The shootout has continued each year, and in 2005 it was renamed the Ron Knisley Memorial Special Olympics shootout after the long-time committee member and huge Classic supporter, who was also Director of Sports and Competition for Special Olympics Illinois.

In 2006, the first recipients of the Holiday Classic Foundation Scholarships were awarded in an effort to give back to graduating seniors who participated in the Holiday Classic and were extending their educational careers at four-year universities or colleges. To date, the Classic Foundation has awarded $44,000.00 in scholarships to deserving student-athletes.

All of these changes and enhancements over the years have led thousands of fans to discover what we know today as "The Best Basketball This Side Of March!"

The Best of the Best
Over the years the Holiday Classic has seen its share of great teams and players. Here is just a sample of those players:

NBA players:
Kevin Duckworth of the Los Angeles Clippers/Milwaukee Bucks/Washington Bullets/Portland Trail Blazers/San Antonio Spurs (Dolton Thornridge)
Melvin McCants of the Los Angeles Lakers (Chicago Mt. Carmel High School)
Eddy Curry of the Dallas Mavericks/Miami Heat/New York Knicks/Chicago Bulls (South Holland Thornwood High School)
Brian Cook of the Washington Wizards/Los Angeles Clippers/Houston Rockets/Orlando Magic/Los Angeles Lakers (Lincoln High School)

WNBA players:
Latoya Bond of the Indiana Fever/Sacramento Monarchs/Charlotte Sting (Urbana High School)
Angelina Williams of the Detroit Shock/Phoenix Mercury (Chicago Washington High School)
Kayla Pedersen of the Tulsa Shock and Connecticut Sun (Mesa Red Mountain High School, AZ)

European professional leagues players:
Brian Cook (Lincoln) of the Chiba Jets in Japan
Eddy Curry (South Holland Thornwood) played with the Chinese League's Zhejiang Golden Bulls team
Rachel Galligan (Blm. Central Catholic) played with Club Baloncesto Conquero in Spain
Carl Golston (Chicago Phillips) played in New Zealand, Italy and Spain
Damir Krupalija (Rockford Boylan) of the 2002-03 Polish National Champions Anwil Wloclawek, and 2003-04 Belgian National Champions Spirou Charleroi
Brittany Johnson (East Richland) of the 2013 Israel Elitzer Ramla
Olivia Lett (Pana) of the Spain League's Universitario de Ferrol team
Kayla Pederesen (Mesa Red Mountain, AZ) of the Australian Women's National Basketball League Dandenong Rangers
Chasson Randle (Rock Island) of the Czech Republic-based CEZ Nymburk
Blake Schilb (Rantoul) of the French League's Elan Chalon team

Harlem Globetrotter:
Curley "Boo" Johnson (Peoria Central)

Illinois Mr. Basketball award winners:
Brian Cook (Lincoln) – 1999
Eddy Curry (Thornwood) – 2001
Chasson Randle (Rock Island) – 2011

Illinois Ms. Basketball award winners:
Brittany Johnson (Olney East Richland) – 2007

McDonald's High School All-Americans:
Brian Cook (Lincoln) – 1999
Eddy Curry (Thornwood) – 2001
Tori McCoy (Champaign St. Thomas More) – 2016
Kayla Pedersen (Mesa Red Mountain, AZ) – 2007
Mike Robinson (Peoria Richwoods) – 1996
Chuck Verderber (Lincoln)- 1978

Naismith National Player of the Year award finalist:
Tori McCoy (Champaign St. Thomas More) – 2016

Wendy's High School Heisman Trophy finalists:
Kelly Curran (Blm Central Catholic) – 2009
Rebekah Ehresman (El Paso-Gridley) – 2013

NCAA Final Four participants:
1997 – John Baines (Normal U-High), Korey Coon (East Peoria) and Nathan Hubbard (Normal U-High) lead Illinois Wesleyan University to the D-III Men's National Championship title
2000 – Mark Vershaw (East Peoria) lead University of Wisconsin to the Final Four
2005 – Brian Randle (Peoria Notre Dame) was a redshirt freshman on the University of Illinois team that reached the D-I championship game
2008-12 – Kayla Pedersen (Mesa Red Mountain, AZ) lead Stanford University to four consecutive Final Four appearances
2009-11 – Emily Hanley (Normal Community) and Amanda Clifton (Rock Island Alleman) helped lead Illinois State University to three straight WNIT Final Four appearances from 2009 to 2011
2011 & 2012 – Brittany Hasselbring (Kankakee Bishop Mac), Olivia Lett (Pana), Karen Solari (Park Ridge Maine South), Annie Brown (Normal West), Katy Seibring (Normal Community), Haley Kitchell (Taylor Ridge Rockridge) and Jordan Steinbrueck (Normal U-High) lead Illinois Wesleyan University to the 2012 D-III Women's National Championship after taking them to the 2011 D-III Women's Final Four (fourth place)
2012 & 2015 – Chasson Randle (Rock Island) lead the Stanford Cardinal to the NIT Tournament Championship
2013 – Matt Vogrich (Lake Forest) and Max Bielfeldt (Peoria Notre Dame) helped lead the Michigan Wolverines to the D-I Championship Game and Final Four in Atlanta

Illinois' all-time prep career scorer:
Brittany Johnson (Olney East Richland) became Illinois' all-time prep career scorer (male or female) on Dec. 28, 2006 during the second round of the State Farm Holiday Classic. She played four seasons for The Ohio State University women's basketball team.

Illinois' all-time prep career rusher (football):
James Robinson (Rockford Lutheran) became the IHSA's career rushing leader on Oct. 9, 2015 in a game vs. Byron.

NFL Super Bowl Champion:
Michael Hoomanawanui (Bloomington Central Catholic) of the 2015 New England Patriots (originally a 5th round draft pick of the St. Louis Rams in 2010)

BSC National Championship football game participant:
Tommy Rees (Lake Forest) helped lead the Notre Dame Fighting Irish to the 2013 national championship college football game vs. Alabama.

European Professional Football players:
Chris Markey (New Orleans Jesuit) played for the Zurich Renegades and was named the Swiss League Offensive MVP.

Major League Baseball/minor league players:
Kevin Seitzer (Lincoln) played in the MLB from 1986 to 1997 with the Kansas City Royals, Milwaukee Brewers, Oakland A's and Cleveland Indians, making the 1987 All-Star team and finishing as runner-up for the American League Rookie of the Year award. Kevin is currently the hitting coach for the Atlanta Braves.
Kevin Roberson (Decatur Eisenhower)  played in the MLB from 1993 to 1996 with the Chicago Cubs and New York Mets
Tyson Blaser (Taylor Ridge Rockridge) signed a minor league deal with the New York Yankees in 2011 and started the 2013 season with their Class AA affiliate Trenton Thunder.
Robbie Minor (Rock Falls) played one season (2007) in the New York Yankees minor league system, and the 2008 season for the Gateway Grizzlies in the Frontier League
Josh Parr (Chillicothe IVC) signed a minor league deal with the Arizona Diamondbacks in 2011 after playing at the University of Illinois. Parr finished his career with the South Bend Silver Hawks in 2014.
Zach McAllister (Chillicothe IVC) was drafted by the New York Yankees in 2006 and traded to the Cleveland Indians in 2010 where he made his major league debut on July 7, 2011, vs. the Toronto Blue Jays. Zach finished up his fifth season with the Indians in 2015.
Jakob Junis (Rock Falls) was drafted by the Kansas City Royals in 2011 and finished the 2015 season with the Class A Advanced Wilmington Blue Rocks.

U.S. Olympian:
Ogonna Nnamani member of the 2004 and 2008 United States Olympic women's volleyball team (Normal U-High)

Professional soccer player:
Ashlee Pistorius won the Honda Sports Award in 2008 as the nation's top collegiate soccer player at Texas A&M, and played for the Boston Renegades of the USL W-League (Normal U-High)

All-Quarter-century team
In 2003, fans had a chance to vote on the most outstanding performers in the 25-year history of the tournament.  The following team was chosen:
Brian Cook, Lincoln | 315 votes
Eddy Curry, Thornwood | 271 votes
Joey Range, Galesburg | 216 votes
Gregg Alexander, Lincoln  | 143 votes
Robbie Minor, Rock Falls | 126 votes
Damir Krupaliga, Rockford Boylan | 121 votes

Past boys' champions
Note: Starting in 2002, the Grand Championship game was eliminated and two champions, one in each class, were crowned.

Past Grand Champions

1975 Normal Community
1976 LaSalle-Peru
1977 Lincoln
1978 East Moline
1979 Galesburg
1980 Lincoln
1981 Galesburg
1982 Galesburg
1983 Galesburg
1984 Decatur Eisenhower
1985 Normal Community
1986 (No tournament held)
1987 (No tournament held)
1988 (No tournament held)
1989 (No tournament held)
1990 Sherrard
1991 Normal UHigh
1992 Gridley
1993 Peoria Richwoods
1994 East Peoria
1995 Rockford Boylan
1996 Manito Midwest Central
1997 Galesburg
1998 Rockford Boylan
1999 South Holland Thornwood
2000 South Holland Thornwood
2001 South Holland Thornwood

Past Small School Boys Champions
 2002 Quincy Notre Dame
 2003 Lagrange Keystone, Ohio
 2004 Quincy Notre Dame
 2005 Hartsburg-Emden
 2006 Bloomington Central Catholic
 2007 Bloomington Central Catholic
 2008 Peoria Christian
 2009 Minonk Fieldcrest
 2010 Rock Falls
 2011 Quincy Notre Dame
 2012 Rockford Lutheran
 2013 Rockford Lutheran
 2014 Rockford Lutheran
 2015 Quincy Notre Dame
 2016 Quincy Notre Dame
 2017 Aurora Christian

Past Large School Boys Champions
 2002 South Holland Thornwood
 2003 Chicago Prosser
 2004 Mt. Zion
 2005 South Holland Thornwood
 2006 South Holland Thornwood
 2007 Rockton-Hononegah
 2008 Normal Community
 2009 Champaign Centennial
 2010 Peoria Notre Dame
 2011 Normal Community
 2012 North Chicago
 2013 North Chicago
 2014 Normal Community
 2015 Rock Island
 2016 Joliet Central
 2017 Normal Community

Past Girls Champions
Note: Starting in 2001, the Grand Championship game was eliminated and two champions, one in each class, were crowned.

Past Grand Champions
 1997 Galesburg
 1998 Galesburg
 1999 Galesburg
 2000 Rock Island Alleman

Past Small School Girls Champions
 2001 Seneca
 2002 Normal UHigh
 2003 Bloomington Central Catholic
 2004 Rock Island Alleman
 2005 Chicago John Hope
 2006 Olney East Richland
 2007 Rochester
 2008 Bloomington Central Catholic
 2009 Bloomington Central Catholic
 2010 Bloomington Central Catholic
 2011 El Paso-Gridley
 2012 Champaign St. Thomas More
 2013 Champaign St. Thomas More
 2014 Rochester
 2015 Rockford Lutheran
 2016 Camp Point Central / Augusta Southeastern
 2017 Annawan

Past Large School Girls Champions
 2001 Geneseo
 2002 Peoria Richwoods
 2003 Normal Community
 2004 Peoria Richwoods
 2005 Peoria Richwoods
 2006 Bolingbrook
 2007 Chicago John Hope
 2008 Peoria Richwoods
 2009 Springfield
 2010 Springfield
 2011 Park Ridge Maine South
 2012 Champaign Centennial
 2013 Springfield
 2014 Normal University
 2015 Chicago North Lawndale
 2016 Rock Island
 2017 Morton

State Farm Holiday Classic Scholarship Award
In 2006 the Classic Tournament, Inc., the nonprofit corporation which runs the largest co-ed high school holiday basketball tournament in the nation, selected four winners to be the first-ever recipients of the Holiday Classic Scholarship Award.  Each winner received a $1,000 scholarship to go directly to their college of choice to help pay for tuition costs.

Established to recognize and award scholarships to eligible high school seniors who participated in the event, a selection committee chooses a male and female winner from each of the Small School and Large School brackets.

Holiday Classic Scholarship recipients:
Nick Patkunas, Normal U-High (2015)
Carolyn Peters, Normal West (2015)
Karalee White, Leroy (2015)
Nathaniel Wieting, Rockford Lutheran (2015)
Alexa Adams - Belvidere North (2014)
Rebekah Ehresman - El Paso-Gridley (2014)
Michael Plecki - Champaign St. Thomas-More (2014)
Trey Sigel - Rock Island (2014)
Bradley Dulee, Normal U-High (2013)
Lauren Frank, Springfield Sacred Heart-Griffin (2013)
Cole Hasselbring, Cissna Park (2013)
Megan O'Donnell, Bloomington Central Catholic (2013)
Brian Ehresman - El Paso-Gridley (2012)
Paige Lobdell - Sterling (2012)
Annie O'Malley - Bloomington Central Catholic (2012)
Patrick Walsh - Lombard Glenbard East (2012)
Nickolena Coop - Downs Tri-Valley (2011)
Blake Doane - Quincy Notre Dame (2011)
Kayla Moore - Sterling Newman (2011)
Ryan Schmidt - Bloomington Central Catholic (2011)
Kevin Bischoff – Normal Community (2010)
Rachael Graham – St. Joseph-Ogden (2010)
Erin McGinnis – Normal West (2010)
Andrew Sipes – Grayslake Central (2010)
Kristen Baldwin, Normal Community (2009)
Luke Harbers, Normal University (2009)
Cora Jeffers, Williamsville (2009)
Ross Munsterman, Crescent-Iroquois (2009)
Brandi Branka, Kankakee Bishop Mac (2008)
Andrew Etheridge, Normal Community (2008)
Kati Hinshaw, Normal West (2008)
Randall Koehler, Roanoke-Benson (2008)
Samantha Reich, Park Ridge Maine South (2008)
Jack Hainline, Stanford Olympia (2007)
Patrick Doggett, Crescent Iroquois (2007)
Kimberly White, Olney East Richland (2007)
Matt Pelton, Bloomington Central Catholic (2006)
Cherelle Gay, Bloomington (2006)
Jordan Christensen, Sherrard (2006)
Taylor Baucom, Camp Point Central (2006)

Ron Knisley Memorial Special Olympics Shootout
On October 13, 2005, the Classic Tournament Inc. lost a very special and vital part of this event when Ron Knisley, Director of Sports and Competition for Special Olympics Illinois lost his battle to cancer. That year, the tournament decided to name the Special Olympics portion of the State Farm Holiday Classic after the man who was responsible for bringing the two groups together.

The shootout, which brings in area Special Olympics Illinois (SOI) basketball teams as part of championship day at the annual State Farm Holiday Classic basketball tournament, is now known as the Ron Knisley Memorial Special Olympics Shootout. The Shootout traditionally invites six teams who play games on the final day of the tournament on practice courts at the Shirk Center.  Then, each of the teams is featured during half-time of the championship games on the final night of the tournament in an 8-minute, running clock exhibition on the main floor.

Past participants in the Shootout include teams from the following programs:

Beardstown
Bloomington SOAR
Bradley-Bourbonnais High School
Champaign-Urbana Special Recreation
Decatur Park District
Eastern Illinois Special Olympics
Jacksonville Pathway
Lincoln Park District
Lincolnway
Neuwohner (MO)
Pekin IRVSRA
Peoria Heart of Illinois
Pontiac Futures
Porter County, Indiana
Princeton Gateway Services
Rushville
Southern Illinois
Springfield
Thornwood

References

External links
State Farm Holiday Classic official website
Pantagraph newspaper—provides extensive tournament coverage
SFHC Facebook page

Basketball competitions in Illinois
Special Olympics
Sports in Bloomington–Normal
Organizations established in 1975
High school basketball competitions in the United States